Arhopala critala is a species of butterfly of the family Lycaenidae. It is found on Serang and Ambon.

References

Butterflies described in 1860
Arhopala
Butterflies of Indonesia
Taxa named by Baron Cajetan von Felder